Pearl River Central High School is a public high school in Carriere, Mississippi, United States. It is a part of the Pearl River County School District.

Athletics 
The following sports are offered at Pearl River Central:

 Baseball
 Basketball
 Cross Country
 Football
 Golf
 Soccer
 Softball
 Swim
 Track & Field 
 Dance

State championships
Baseball
2017 Mississippi 5A State Champions
Dance
14x State Champions

Demographics 
89.1% of the student body at Pearl River Central identify as white, making up a majority of the student body with the minority enrollment being 10.9%.

References

External links
 

Education in Pearl River County, Mississippi
Schools in Pearl River County, Mississippi
Public high schools in Mississippi